Jacksonia is a genus of about forty, mostly leafless broom-like shrubs or small trees in the flowering plant family Fabaceae. The genus is endemic to Australia and species occur in a range of habitats in all Australian states except South Australia.

Description
Plants in the genus Jacksonia are mostly leafless shrubs or small trees with rigid branches, and leaves reduced to small scales. The flowers are arranged in spikes or racemes with small bracts or bracteoles. The sepals are joined to form a short tube and the petals are usually shorter than the sepals. The standard or banner petal is circular or kidney-shaped, the wing petals are oblong and the keel petal is more or less straight and wider than the wings.

Taxonomy
The genus Jacksonia was first formally described by James Edward Smith from an unpublished manuscript by Robert Brown. Smith's description was published in 1811 in Rees's Cyclopædia along with a description of J. scoparia and J. spinosa. Smith noted that Brown had named the species "in memory of the late Mr. George Jackson, F.L.S., a man of the most excellent and amiable character, devoted to the science of botany". Jackson had died suddenly at the age of 31, in January of the same year.

Accepted species
Jacksonia comprises the following species:

 Jacksonia aculeata W.Fitzg.
 Jacksonia alata Benth.
 Jacksonia angulata Benth.

 Jacksonia argentea C.A.Gardner
 Jacksonia calycina Domin
 Jacksonia capitata Benth.
 Jacksonia carduacea Meisn.
 Jacksonia compressa Turcz.
 Jacksonia condensata Crisp & J.R.Wheeler
 Jacksonia cupulifera Meissner

 Jacksonia dilatata Benth.
 Jacksonia eremodendron E.Pritz.
 Jacksonia fasciculata Meisn.
 Jacksonia floribunda Endl.
 Jacksonia foliosa Turcz.
 Jacksonia forrestii F.Muell.
 Jacksonia furcellata (Bonpl.) DC.—grey stinkwood

 Jacksonia grevilleoides Turcz.
 Jacksonia hakeoides Meisn.
 Jacksonia horrida DC.

 Jacksonia lehmannii Meisn.
 Jacksonia macrocalyx Meisn.

 Jacksonia nematoclada F.Muell.
 Jacksonia odontoclada Benth.
 Jacksonia racemosa Meisn.
 Jacksonia ramosissima Benth.
 Jacksonia restioides Meisn.
 Jacksonia rhadinoclada F.Muell.
 Jacksonia rhadinoclona F.Muell.
 Jacksonia scoparia Sm.— dogwood
 Jacksonia sericea Benth.— waldjumi
 Jacksonia spinosa (Labill.) Sm.
 Jacksonia stackhousii F.Muell.

 Jacksonia sternbergiana Benth.— stinkwood, green stinkwood

 Jacksonia thesioides Benth.

 Jacksonia velutina Benth.
 Jacksonia vernicosa Benth.

Species of uncertain taxonomic status
The status of the following species is unresolved:

 Jacksonia acicularis Chappill
 Jacksonia anomala Ewart & Morrison
 Jacksonia anthoclada Chappill
 Jacksonia arenicola Chappill
 Jacksonia arida Chappill
 Jacksonia arnhemica Chappill
 Jacksonia calcicola Chappill
 Jacksonia chappilliae C.F.Wilkins
 Jacksonia debilis Chappill
 Jacksonia dendrospinosa Chappill
 Jacksonia divisa Chappill
 Jacksonia dumosa Meisn.
 Jacksonia effusa Chappill
 Jacksonia elongata Chappill
 Jacksonia epiphyllum Chappill
 Jacksonia flexuosa Chappill
 Jacksonia gracillima Chappill
 Jacksonia grandiflora Paxton
 Jacksonia hemisericea D.A.Herb.
 Jacksonia humilis Chappill
 Jacksonia intricata Chappill
 Jacksonia jackson Chappill
 Jacksonia juncea Turcz.
 Jacksonia lanicarpa Chappill
 Jacksonia lateritica Chappill
 Jacksonia macrocarpa Benth.
 Jacksonia nutans Chappill
 Jacksonia pendens Chappill
 Jacksonia petrophiliodes W.Fitzg.
 Jacksonia petrophiloides W.Fitzg.
 Jacksonia piptomeris Benth.
 Jacksonia pungens Chappill
 Jacksonia quairading Chappill
 Jacksonia quinkanensis Chappill
 Jacksonia ramulosa Chappill
 Jacksonia reclinata Chappill
 Jacksonia remota Chappill
 Jacksonia reticulata DC.
 Jacksonia rigida Chappill
 Jacksonia rubra Chappill
 Jacksonia rupestris Chappill
 Jacksonia spicata Chappill
 Jacksonia stellaris Chappill
 Jacksonia tarinensis Chappill
 Jacksonia velveta Chappill
 Jacksonia venosa Chappill
 Jacksonia viminalis A.Cunn. ex Benth.
 Jacksonia viscosa Chappill

References

References

 
 

 
Fabales of Australia
Fabaceae genera